Holtekilen Folk High School is Baptist Christian folk high school situated at Stabekk in Bærum, Norway. It has 85 pupils and is owned by the Baptist Union of Norway. It features six lines: music, fashion/design, travel, film/photography, street sociology and ethics/sustainability. It is the folk high school the closest to Oslo. The school was founded as the Baptist Folk High School in 1958. It took its current name in 1979.

References

Folk high schools in Norway
Education in Bærum
Baptist schools in Norway
Baptist Union of Norway
1958 establishments in Norway
Educational institutions established in 1958